Evelyn Lauder (née Hausner; August 12, 1936 – November 12, 2011) was an Austrian American businesswoman, socialite and philanthropist who has been credited as one of the creators and popularizers of the pink ribbon as a symbol for awareness of breast cancer.

Early life
She was born Evelyn Hausner in 1936 in Vienna, Austria, to a Jewish family. Lauder’s family fled Nazi-occupied Austria in 1938, using their household silver to get visas to Belgium. They then moved on to England where her mother was sent to an internment camp on the Isle of Man and Evelyn was placed in a nursery. The family arrived in New York City in 1940.

She graduated from Hunter College High School in 1954. She then attended Hunter College, part of the City University of New York, where she studied Psychology and Anthropology and also where she met her future husband, Leonard Lauder, then a trainee naval officer, on a blind date. She graduated from Hunter College in 1958. The couple were married on July 5, 1959. After the marriage, she worked for several years as a public school teacher in Harlem before leaving to work with her husband at the company founded in 1946 by her mother-in-law, Estée Lauder, which at the time sold six products: a red lipstick, creams, lotions, and Youth Dew fragrance in a bath oil.

Career
Lauder was the Senior Corporate Vice President of the Estée Lauder Companies and a member of the board of overseers at the Memorial Sloan-Kettering Cancer Center. A
1995 profile in The New York Times called her "an immaculately turned-out, awesomely organized woman" who had started to fill the public role that had been filled by her mother-in-law, Estée Lauder.

Lauder, an executive at Estée Lauder, created the Clinique brand and developed its product line. She worked as the training director for Clinique and was the first person to wear the trademark white lab coat, now worn by Clinique salespeople at cosmetic departments worldwide.

Breast cancer activist
Lauder personally raised much of the $13.6 million that went to create the Evelyn H. Lauder Breast Center at Memorial Sloan-Kettering Cancer Center, which opened in October 1992 and focuses on the treatment and diagnosis of breast cancer. She helped raise an additional $5 million to create an endowment to be used to fund clinical research there.

Self magazine's first annual issue for National Breast Cancer Awareness Month came after an April 1991 lunch at the 21 Club, at which Lauder discussed ideas for articles about breast cancer with her friend Alexandra Penney, who was then serving as editor of Self.

Together with Penney, Lauder established The Breast Cancer Research Foundation and formalized the pink ribbon as a symbol for breast cancer awareness as part of Self magazine's second annual Breast Cancer Awareness Month issue in 1992. Penney's inspiration to improve on the success of the magazine's first annual issue was to create a ribbon that would be placed in Estee Lauder's New York City stores. Lauder made the commitment to have the ribbons placed on the company's cosmetics counters across the United States.

By 1993, Lauder had overseen the creation of a new shade called Pink Ribbon that was part of her personal and corporate effort to raise breast cancer awareness. Her husband paid for the cost of registering The Breast Cancer Research Foundation in all 50 states. By the start of 1995, some $900,000 had been raised for the foundation, including $120,000 from the sale of Pink Ribbon lipstick and blusher and $190,000 from the sale of the Clinique Berry Kiss pink lipstick.

By October 2008, the Estée Lauder Companies estimated that the firm's Breast Cancer Awareness Campaign had raised $335 million towards research and distributed 80 million pink ribbons.

Following Lauder's death, Delta Air Lines, which had already dedicated one of its Boeing 767-400ER long-haul planes in honor of the Breast Cancer Research Foundation that Lauder founded and painted it in a pink livery while Lauder was living, re-christened and renamed the same plane in her memory.

Personal life
She was married to Leonard Lauder, former chairman of the Estée Lauder Companies, from 1959 until her death. They had two sons: William P. Lauder and Gary M. Lauder, Managing Director of Lauder Partners LLC.

Death
Evelyn Lauder died at home in Manhattan from complications of nongenetic ovarian cancer. She was a longtime resident of Palm Beach, Florida. A private funeral service was held at the Central Synagogue in New York City.

Awards And Nominations
Double Helix Medal
 2010: CSHL Double Helix Medal Honoree

References

External links
Personal website
Evelyn H. Lauder, Estée Lauder Companies
 

1936 births
2011 deaths
Activists from New York (state)
American cosmetics businesspeople
American health activists
American retail chief executives
American women educators
American socialites
American women chief executives
Austrian emigrants to the United States
Austrian Jews
Austrian philanthropists
Businesspeople from Florida
Businesspeople from New York City
Deaths from cancer in New York (state)
Deaths from ovarian cancer
Hunter College alumni
Hunter College High School alumni
Jewish American philanthropists
Lauder family
Northwestern University alumni
People from Manhattan
People from Palm Beach, Florida
Philanthropists from New York (state)
Educators from New York City
Jewish emigrants from Nazi Germany to the United Kingdom
Jewish emigrants from Nazi Germany to the United States
Schoolteachers from New York (state)